Jessica Marie Wik (born 30 January 1992) is a Swedish professional footballer who plays as a defender for FC Rosengård and the Swedish national team. In the 2013–14 winter season she played for Australian W-League club Melbourne Victory. She is predominantly a left back, although she also plays on the right side.

Club career

Linköping, 2010–17
Wik joined Linköpings FC from Smedby AIS on a three-year contract in 2010, but was initially loaned back to Smedby. In November 2011 she extended her contract with Linköpings after winning her place in the first team.

Melbourne Victory, 2013–14
Wik joined Melbourne Victory ahead of the 2013–14 season, and was named the 2014 Player of the Year in Australia.

Arsenal, 2017–19
On 18 August 2017, Arsenal announced that they had signed Wik ahead of the new season. In March 2019 Wik left Arsenal to play for FC Rosengård.

FC Rosengård, 2019–
Wik returned to Sweden in 2019 to increase her chances of being named to the national team squad for the 2019 FIFA Women's World Cup in France. She signed with FC Rosengård and played in seven games during the 2019 Damallsvenskan season. Rosengård finished the season in first place with a  record.

After returning to Rosengård for the 2020 Damallsvenskan season, Wik was a starting defender in 15 of the 18 matches she played. During a match against Kopparbergs/Göteborg FC on 23 August, she scored the team's second goal of the match in Rosengård's 3–0 win. Rosengård finished in second place with a  record.

International career

Wik made her debut for the senior Sweden team in a 2–1 loss to Canada on 22 November 2011. Later Coach Pia Sundhage named Wik in the Sweden squad for UEFA Women's Euro 2013.

Honours

Club
Melbourne Victory FC
 W-League: 2013–14

Linköpings FC
 Svenska Cupen: 2013–14, 2014–15
 Svenska Supercupen: 2010
 Damallsvenskan: 2016

 Arsenal
 WSL Cup: 2017–18

FC Rosengård
 Damallsvenskan: 2019

International
Sweden
 UEFA Women's Under-19 Championship: 2012 UEFA Women's Under-19 Championship
 Summer Olympic Games: Silver Medal, 2016

References

External links

Living people
1992 births
Sportspeople from Norrköping
Swedish women's footballers
Sweden women's international footballers
Women's association football fullbacks
Damallsvenskan players
Linköpings FC players
Melbourne Victory FC (A-League Women) players
Arsenal W.F.C. players
2015 FIFA Women's World Cup players
Footballers at the 2016 Summer Olympics
Olympic footballers of Sweden
Medalists at the 2016 Summer Olympics
Olympic silver medalists for Sweden
Olympic medalists in football
Expatriate women's soccer players in Australia
Expatriate women's footballers in England
Swedish expatriates in Australia
Swedish expatriates in England
Women's Super League players
Footballers from Östergötland County
UEFA Women's Euro 2017 players